Crackle (also known as Crackle: The Best of Bauhaus) is a greatest hits album by English goth-rock band Bauhaus. The album was released in 1998 by record label Beggars Banquet, during the band's Resurrection Tour. It includes remastered versions of some of their single hits and most popular songs.

Content 

Crackle is a considerably shorter compilation of Bauhaus's work than their previous 'best of' album 1979-1983. A booklet accompanying the CD contains photographs, excerpts from the lyrics, credits, discography and a poem.

Release and reception 

Crackle was released in 1998 by record label Beggars Banquet, during the band's Resurrection Tour.

Stephen Thomas Erlewine of AllMusic described it as "an excellent single-disc overview" of the group's work.

Track listing

Personnel 
 Bauhaus

 Daniel Ash – guitar
 Kevin Haskins – drums, percussion
 David J – bass guitar
 Peter Murphy – vocals

 Technical

 John Dent – remastering
 Steve Webbon – coordination
 Coleman Barks – translation
 Dominic Davies – sleeve photography
 Antoine Giacomoni – sleeve portraits
 Mitch Jenkins – sleeve portraits
 Timothy O'Donnell – sleeve design
 Rumi – poetry

References

External links 

 

Bauhaus (band) compilation albums
1998 greatest hits albums
4AD compilation albums
Beggars Banquet Records compilation albums